Caner Dengin (born December 15, 1987 in Turkey) is a Turkish volleyball player. He is 188 cm and plays as libero. He plays for Fenerbahçe

Sporting achievements

Clubs

National championships
 2015/2016  Turkish SuperCup 2015, with Halkbank Ankara
 2015/2016  Turkish Championship, with Halkbank Ankara

References

1987 births
Living people
Turkish men's volleyball players
Galatasaray S.K. (men's volleyball) players